Andrew Carr may refer to:

 Andrew Carr (footballer) (1908–1983), English footballer
 Andrew J. Carr (born 1958), British surgeon and professor of orthopaedics
 Andy Carr (born 1956), English footballer

See also 
 Andrew Carr Sr. House, Minot, North Dakota